Lexington is an unincorporated community and census-designated place (CDP) in Cowlitz County, Washington, United States. As of the 2020 census, it had a population of 3,834. During the 2010 census, Lexington was part of the West Side Highway CDP.

The CDP is in the western part of the county and is bordered to the southwest by Beacon Hill and to the east by the Cowlitz River. State Route 411 runs through the community, following the Cowlitz. It leads south  to Longview and north  to Castle Rock.

References 

Populated places in Cowlitz County, Washington
Census-designated places in Cowlitz County, Washington
Census-designated places in Washington (state)